Events during the year 1997 in Poland.

Incumbents

Events

January 
 1 January:
 Skępe regained its town rights.
 Pasym, Radlin, Siechnice and Świątniki Górne were granted town rights.

February 
 1 February – The Poznań Fast Tram was opened.

March 
 1 March – Polsat 2 television channel launched.

April 
 2 April – The Constitution of Poland was adopted by the National Assembly.

May 
 25 May – A constitutional referendum was held. The new constitution was narrowly approved, with 53.5% voting in favor. The voter turnout was 43.9%.

June 
 8 June – Queen Jadwiga of Poland was canonized by Pope John Paul II in Kraków.
 10 June – John of Dukla was canonized by Pope John Paul II in Krosno.
 19 June – The University of Białystok was established.

July 
 6 July – 1997 Central European flood: Flooding began in Poland in the towns of Głuchołazy and Prudnik.
 10 July – 1997 Central European flood: Left-bank Opole was flooded.
 12 July – 1997 Central European flood: Wrocław was flooded.
 18 July – 1997 Central European flood: A day of national mourning for the victims of the flood was declared by President Aleksander Kwaśniewski.

September 
 21 September – The 1997 Polish parliamentary election was held, won by the Solidarity Electoral Action.

October 
 3 October – TVN television station launched.
 17 October – The Constitution of Poland came into effect.
19-20 October - The Sejm cross was hung in the building of the Sejm of the Republic of Poland, the lower house of the Polish parliament. by a Solidarity Electoral Action (AWS) MP Tomasz Wójcik. it has hung in the sejm since 1997.

 31 October – Jerzy Buzek became the Prime Minister of Poland.

November 
 11 November – The Cabinet of Jerzy Buzek passed the vote of confidence.

December 
 15 December – The Monument to the Heroes of Warsaw was placed on a new pedestal in Warsaw.

Births

Deaths

January 
 6 January – Edward Osóbka-Morawski, activist and politician, Chairman of the Polish Committee of National Liberation (b. 1909)
 26 January – Mira Zimińska, film actress, director of the Mazowsze folk group (b. 1901)

February 
 27 February – Mieczysław Jagielski, economist and politician, Deputy Prime Minister of the People's Republic of Poland (b. 1924)

March 
 7 March – Agnieszka Osiecka, poet, writer, scenarist, film director, journalist, and songwriter (b. 1936)

April 
 27 April – Piotr Skrzynecki, choreographer, director, and cabaret impresario, creator of the Piwnica pod Baranami literary cabaret (b. 1930)

August 
 9 August – Robert Satanowski, general, later an orchestra and opera director (b. 1918)
 30 August – Ernst Wilimowski, German–Polish football player (b. 1916)

September 
 4 September – Alfred Kałuziński, handball player (b. 1952)

October 
 18 October – Leonard Andrzejewski, actor (b. 1924)
 31 October – Tadeusz Janczar, film actor (b. 1926)

References 

 
Poland
pl:1997#Wydarzenia w Polsce